Bledar Sinella (born 10 August 1976) is a retired Albanian footballer and most recently manager of Egnatia Rrogozhinë football club in the Albanian Second Division.

Managerial career
A successful coach with Besa's youth teams, Sinella was appointed to the manager position of Besa Kavajë's senior team on November 14, 2014 following Artan Mërgjyshi's resignation due to poor results at the start of the season. Sinella also served as assistant manager to Përparim Daiu during his tenure at KF Laçi.

He succeeded Ilir Duro as coach of Egnatia Rrogozhinë in January 2019, only to leave the club himself in April 2019.

Personal life
In May 2019, Sinella withdrew as a candidate in the race to become mayor of Kavajë.

References

1976 births
Living people
Footballers from Kavajë
Albanian footballers
Association football midfielders
Besa Kavajë players
Kategoria Superiore players
Albanian football managers
Besa Kavajë managers
FK Tomori Berat managers
KF Laçi managers
FK Egnatia managers
Kategoria Superiore managers